Bantu Education may refer to:

 Bantu Education Act
 Bantu Education Department
 Bantu Educational Kinema Experiment